Muhammad Umar Pehlwan (محمد عمر پہلوان), (born 21 April 1975) is a Pakistani(پاکستانی) freestyle and Greco-Roman and traditional wrestler. His nickname is Rustam (رُستم).

He was awarded Best Player of the Year by the Government of Pakistan in 2009. He won four gold medals in 1993, 2004, 2006, 2010, at the South Asian Games. He also won two silver medals in 1995 and 1999 at the South Asian Games, He won a bronze medal in the 1994 Commonwealth Games in Victoria, Canada.

He won two silver medals in 1993 and 2009 at the Commonwealth Wrestling Championships.  He also won five bronze medals in 2007, 2009, 2011, at the Commonwealth Wrestling Championship.  He made National Champion at the Senior Level in 1991, and after his international debut in 1991 at the senior level. He has also been active in traditional mud wrestling (دیسی کُشتی)where he has won Rustam e Gujranwala division title, Rustam e Punjab title, 
Rustam Pak o Hind title twice,
Hind Kesari.

He won gold medals in Senior Pakistan National Wrestling Championship and National Games 1991 to 2010.  He has been regularly representing Pakistan in international championships and tournaments at freestyle and Greco-Roman wrestling from 1991 to 2011 and won many medals. He serves as a wrestler in Gepco, Pakistan Wapda.

Family Background
Muhammad Umar Pehlwan belongs to a very famous wrestling family of Gujranwala, Pakistan.

Grandfather:
His Grandfather's name is 
Pir Muhammad pehlwan.He started wrestling at the age of 15 years old in 1905 at Gujranwala city Punjab Pakistan.He was a very famous wrestler of his time.
He fought with a famous wrestlers in the Indian subcontinent.

Father:
His father's name is Lala Muhammad Anwar.He started wrestling at the  age of 16 years old in 1964 at Gujranwala, Punjab Pakistan.
He also won 3 times gold medals in Punjab province wrestling championship and won a silver medal in Pakistan national wrestling championship.
Lala Muhammad Anwar is a renowned wrestling coach of Pakistan.

Brothers:
Muhammad Usman Pehlwan, 
Muhammad Ali Pehlwan,
Muhammad Salman Pehlwan,
These four wrestler brothers set a record in Pakistan wrestling history  by winning a gold medals in the National Wrestling Championships. 
The Pakistani people call the four Brothers by the name of Rustam Brothers.

Children:
Muhammad Umar Pehlwan Married in 2008. He has two children, a son Muhammad Abu Bakar Butt and daughter Fatima Butt.

Muhammad Umar Pehlwan's brothers and sisters wish that every one of our children will become a wrestler while maintaining the traditional of their family and win gold medals in World Wrestling championships and Olympic Games and make their family and Pakistan proud and famous.

Career
Muhammad Umar Pehlwan belongs to a wrestling family of Gujranwala, Pakistan.
He started wrestling in 1985 when he was ten years old, under the supervision of his Father Lala Muhammad Anwar and his coach Ch. Shabeer Hussain. Before that he tried boxing, he came to a jinnah health wrestling club aged 10 years old weighing 32 kilograms.  At age 13 he competed in the 38 kg in under 16 national wrestling championship and won one position in 1988. At the age of 15 years, Pehlwan won his first gold medal in the 48 kg class at the Pakistan Senior National Wrestling Championships in 1991 a record in the history of Pakistan wrestling.
He came to an international competition in senior Asian wrestling  championships in 1991.

Pehlwan won gold medals at the National Wrestling Championships and National Games in Pakistan for twenty consecutive years from 1991 to 2010 and won countless medals for Pakistan while representing Pakistan in 55 countries with the Pakistan wrestling team. He has also been active in traditional mud wrestling where he has won the title of Rustam Pak o Hind and Hind Kesri twice.

Images

References

Pakistani male sport wrestlers
Wrestlers at the 1994 Commonwealth Games
Commonwealth Games bronze medallists for Pakistan
Living people
Wrestlers at the 2010 Commonwealth Games
Commonwealth Games medallists in wrestling
1975 births
Medallists at the 1994 Commonwealth Games